Edward Lawrence Poulton (25 November 1865 – 19 November 1937) was a British trade unionist.

Poulton was born in Northampton and worked making boots and shoes from an early age.  He joined the National Union of Boot and Shoe Operatives (NUBSO) in 1887, and was appointed secretary of its Northampton branch four years later.  He founded the Trade Union Club in the town in 1890, and was president of its trades council in 1892, using the opportunity to help found the Midland Federation of Trades Councils.  He also became a Liberal-Labour politician, and was elected to Northampton's school board in 1895, then as an alderman on the council in 1898.  In 1906, he became the first worker to serve as the Mayor of Northampton.

In 1908, Poulton was elected General Secretary of NUBSO, serving until 1930.  He was awarded the OBE in 1917, and served on the Parliamentary Committee of the Trades Union Congress (TUC) from 1916, acting as its President in 1921.  He was also active in the International Labour Office, serving as workers' vice-chairman from 1928 until 1931.

References

1865 births
1937 deaths
General Secretaries of the National Union of Boot and Shoe Operatives
Liberal-Labour (UK) politicians
Mayors of places in Northamptonshire
Members of the General Council of the Trades Union Congress
Members of the Parliamentary Committee of the Trades Union Congress
People from Northampton
Presidents of the Trades Union Congress